Michael Anthony Erceg (26 March 1956 – 4 November 2005) was an Auckland, New Zealand businessman who founded Independent Liquor.

Independent Liquor was New Zealand’s largest independently owned liquor distributor, known for its  Ready to Drink (RTD) brands such as KGB, Woodstock and Vodka Cruisers.

At the time of his death in 2005, Erceg as one of the New Zealand's wealthiest individuals.

Early life
Erceg was born in West Auckland in to a Croatian winemaking family who operated Pacific vineyard  in Te Atatū South. He attended Kelston Boys High School. Erceg was a top pupil, who skipped sixth form and was awarded Dux of Kelston Boys High School in 1972.

Erceg earned his PhD nine years later, from the University of California, Berkeley, and went on to teach math at university level.

Business career
Erceg soon returned to New Zealand to help with his ailing father's wine business in West Auckland. However, after a family disagreement over the direction of the wine company, Erceg left the company and formed Calypso Beverage Company Ltd in 1987. This business evolved to Independent Liquor.

Erceg relied upon alternative marketing strategies to combat the larger players in the New Zealand alcohol industry. He provided incentives to their retail customers that helped them increase their profit margins.

By 2005, Independent Liquor had become the third largest liquor distributor in the country with a 65% market share for  RTDs. Independent Liquor was also exporting their products to 70 countries. On July 1, 2019, Independent Liquor (NZ) Ltd officially changed its name to Asahi Beverages (NZ) Ltd.

Death
In November 2005, Erceg died in a helicopter accident. The helicopter he was piloting crashed  near Raglan, New Zealand. Also killed was his passenger, Grolsch International export director Guus Klatte. The wreckage was not found for two weeks.

References

1956 births
2005 deaths
20th-century New Zealand businesspeople
People educated at Kelston Boys' High School
Businesspeople from Auckland
University of California, Berkeley alumni
New Zealand people of Croatian descent
Victims of helicopter accidents or incidents